The Advance Arkansas Institute (AAI) is a free market think tank located in Little Rock, Arkansas. The organization's stated mission is "to advance public policy based on free markets, individual liberty, and limited, transparent government." The Institute is headed by Dan Greenberg, a former Arkansas State Representative.

The institute believes that rising poverty is a serious concern in Arkansas and that an effective solution to the issue of poverty is income tax reform. AAI has hosted debates for Arkansas attorney general candidates. AAI has an affiliate, the Arkansas Project, which provides commentary and reporting on Arkansas government, politics, and media.

See also
 Arkansas Policy Foundation

References

External links
 Advance Arkansas Institute
 The Arkansas Project

Libertarian think tanks
Non-profit organizations based in Arkansas